GBE or Gbe may refer to:

Organizations 
 Gale Banks Engineering, a company created by hot rodder Gale Banks
 Glory Boyz Entertainment (also known as GloGang), a rap label
 Great Big Events, a sports and event management company
 Government Business Enterprise, a business enterprise in which a government/state has significant control

Science 
 Genome Biology and Evolution, a scientific journal
 Glycogen branching enzyme, an enzyme
 The general balance equation, a simplified mass balance relation

Other uses 
 Gbe languages, spoken in West Africa
 GBE (Order of the British Empire), Knight/Dame Grand Cross of the Order of the British Empire
 Gospel Book (British Library, MS Egerton 768), an illuminated Gospel Book in Latin
 GBE, the IATA code for Sir Seretse Khama International Airport
 Gigabit Ethernet (GbE), in computing

See also 
 G. B. Edwards (disambiguation)